ADP-ribosylation factor 3 is a protein that in humans is encoded by the ARF3 gene.

Function 

ADP-ribosylation factor 3 (ARF3) is a member of the human ARF gene family. These genes encode small guanine nucleotide-binding proteins that stimulate the ADP-ribosyltransferase activity of cholera toxin and play a role in vesicular trafficking and as activators of phospholipase D.  The gene products include 6 ARF proteins and 11 ARF-like proteins and constitute 1 family of the RAS superfamily. The ARF proteins are categorized as class I (ARF1, ARF2, and ARF3), class II (ARF4 and ARF5) and class III (ARF6) and members of each class share a common gene organization. The ARF3 gene contains five exons and four introns.

Interactions 

ARF3 has been shown to interact with:

 ARFIP1, 
 ARFIP2, 
 GGA1, 
 GGA3,  and
 KIF23.

References

External links

Further reading